Rowhill Nature Reserve or Rowhill Copse is a   Local Nature Reserve (LNR) which straddles the border between Aldershot in Hampshire and Farnham in Surrey. It is owned by Rushmoor Borough Council, was declared an LNR by Waverley Borough Council and is managed by Rowhill Nature Reserve Society.

This site is mainly coppiced woodland with hazel and sweet chestnut. There are also ponds, a stream, heath and marshland. It is the source of the River Blackwater.

Access points include Cranmore Lane.

See also
Aldershot Park
Brickfields Country Park
Manor Park
Municipal Gardens, Aldershot
Princes Gardens, Aldershot

References

External links
 Rowhill nature reserve

Local Nature Reserves in Surrey 
Aldershot
Parks and open spaces in Aldershot
Parks and open spaces in Hampshire